The Tera Group is a geological group in the Cameros Basin and Sierra de la Demanda in Burgos, Spain. The group contains several formations whose strata date back to the Early Cretaceous. Dinosaur remains are among the fossils that have been recovered from the formation.

Fossil content 
 Euornithopoda indet 
 Iguanodon cf. fittoni

Correlation

See also 
 List of dinosaur-bearing rock formations

References

Bibliography

Further reading 
 C. Pascual Arribas and N. Hernández Medrano. 2015. Nuevas huellas de estegosáuridos en el Titoniense-Berriasiense de la Cuenca de Cameros (Formación Magaña) [New tracks of stegosaurids in the Tithonian-Berriasian of the Cameros Basin (Magaña Formation)]. Revista de la Sociedad Geológica de España 28(2):15-27
 F. Torcida Fernández Baldor. 2005. Los dinosaurios de Castilla y León [The dinosaurs of Castilla y León]. Patrimonio Histórico de Castilla y León 6(23):23-34
 J. I. Ruiz Omeñaca and J. I. Canudo. 2003. Dinosaurios (Saurischia, Ornithischia) en el Barremiense (Cretácico Inferior) de la península Ibérica [Dinosaurs (Saurischia, Ornithischia) in the Barremian (Lower Cretaceous) of the Iberian peninsula]. In F. Pérez Lorente (ed.), Dinosaurios y Otros Reptiles Mesozóicos de España 269-312
 F. Pérez Lorente. 2002. La distribución de yacimientos y de tipos de huellas de dinosaurios en la Cuenca de Cameroa (La Rioja, Burgos, Soria, España) [The distribution of localities and types of dinosaur footprints in the Cameros Basin (La Rioja, Burgos, Soria, Spain)]. Zubia Monográfico 14:191-210

Geologic groups of Europe
Geologic formations of Spain
Lower Cretaceous Series of Europe
Cretaceous Spain
Jurassic System of Europe
Jurassic Spain
Berriasian Stage
Hauterivian Stage
Tithonian Stage
Valanginian Stage
Sandstone formations
Shale formations
Alluvial deposits
Fluvial deposits
Lacustrine deposits
Ichnofossiliferous formations
Paleontology in Spain
Formations